Dormelles is a commune in the Seine-et-Marne department in the Île-de-France region in north-central France.

History
Dormelles was the site of a battle circa 599 between rival Merovingian kings. Chlothar II, ruler of Neustria, faced his cousins, Theuderic II, King of Burgundy, and Theudebert II, King of Austrasia. Chlothar's army suffered a heavy defeat and he fled the field.

Demographics
Inhabitants of Dormelles are called Dormellois.

See also
Communes of the Seine-et-Marne department

References

External links

1999 Land Use, from IAURIF (Institute for Urban Planning and Development of the Paris-Île-de-France région) 

Communes of Seine-et-Marne